The 1956–57 Scottish Cup was the 72nd staging of Scotland's most prestigious football knockout competition. The Cup was won by Falkirk who defeated Kilmarnock in the replayed final.

First round

Second round

Replays

Third round

Fourth round

Replays

Fifth round

Replays

Second Replays

Sixth Round

Replays

Quarter-finals

Semi-finals

Replays

Final

Replay

See also

Scottish Cup seasons
1956–57 in Scottish football